Torch Cay Airport, also referred to as Hog Cay Exuma Airfield  is a private airport located on Torch Cay in the Bahamas.

The runway has the ability land and depart all private piston and turbo-prop planes. It can be used by all Light-Jets, Midsize-Jets, Heavy-Jets, and Ultra Long-Jets and VIP Airliners.

See also
List of airports in the Bahamas

References 

Airports in the Bahamas
Exuma